The Admiral of Patrols  was a former command appointment within the Admiralty during world war one usually held by a junior flag officer the post was established from 1912 to 1916.

History
In the preceding years before world war the Admiralty were assessing the need to protect the navy's main capital ships in the future event of any war, which would be augmented by the possible implementation a coastal patrol and mine-sweeping initiative. The need for some sort of patrol protection function being established was indicated by Admiral Sir Charles Beresford as early as 1907.

In 1909 Admiral Fisher obtained a small number of vessels for experimentation, Beginning about 1910 the Admiralty acknowledged that this sort of service may likely be in the form of local coastal patrol support for the regular navy at this time there was a lack of patrol capabilities within the Royal Navy.

On May 1, 1912 the post of Admiral of Patrols was created and under its command consisted four destroyer flotillas until 1913. After the implementation took place Admiral de Robeck was replaced by a new commander Commodore George A. Ballard. He assumed the duties of Admiral of Patrols on the 1 May 1914  and held the post until it was abolished in 1917.

Commodore/Admiral of Patrols

Assistant to Admiral of Patrols
 Captain Walter H. Cowan, 1 May 1912 – 7 February 1914 
 Captain Edward G. Lowther-Crofton, 7 February 1914 – 1 February 1916

Patrol formations under this command
As of May 1912 – 1914:

Units

Auxiliary patrol
 
The Auxiliary Patrol was a component force under the (ADMP) and composed of a large number of small craft tasked with minesweeping and anti-submarine patrols, initially around the British Isles, but later also in the Mediterranean. The Auxiliary Patrol was the front-line force in the defence of initially the British Isles, but later also the Mediterranean, against German mines and submarines.

See also
Dover Patrol
Northern Patrol
Royal Naval Patrol Service

References

Attribution
Primary source for this article is by Harley Simon, Lovell Tony, (2017), Admiral of Patrols, dreadnoughtproject.org, http://www.dreadnoughtproject.org.

Sources
 Lambert, Nicholas A. (1999). Sir John Fisher's Naval Revolution. Columbia, SC: University of South Carolina Press. 
 Smith, Gordon. (2015). "World War 1 Dispositions of Royal Navy ships". naval-history.net. Naval History.net.

External links

Op
1912 establishments in the United Kingdom
United Kingdom in World War I